Inside the Lines is a 1918 American silent thriller film directed by David Hartford and starring Lewis Stone, Marguerite Clayton and George Field. It was based on a play by Earl Derr Biggers, later remade as a 1930 sound film of the same title.

Synopsis
The Germans order their top spy from Egypt to Gibraltar as part of a plan to destroy the British fleet.

Cast

References

Bibliography
 Ken Wlaschin. Silent Mystery and Detective Movies: A Comprehensive Filmography. McFarland, 2009.

External links
 

1918 films
1910s thriller films
1910s English-language films
American silent feature films
American thriller films
American black-and-white films
Films directed by David Hartford
World Film Company films
American World War I films
American films based on plays
Films set in Egypt
Films set in Gibraltar
Silent thriller films
1910s American films